Stephanie Marie Agli Gallagher (born 1972) is a United States district judge of the United States District Court for the District of Maryland and a former United States magistrate judge for the same court.

Biography 

Gallagher was born in 1972, in Rockville, Connecticut. She received a Bachelor of Arts degree, magna cum laude, in 1994 from Georgetown University, graduating Phi Beta Kappa. She received a Juris Doctor, cum laude, in 1997 from Harvard Law School. She began her legal career as a law clerk to Judge J. Frederick Motz of the United States District Court for the District of Maryland, from 1997 to 1999. From 1999 to 2001, she served as an associate at the law firm of Akin Gump Strauss Hauer & Feld in Washington, D.C. From 2002 to 2008, she served as an Assistant United States Attorney in the Criminal Division of the United States Attorney's Office for the District of Maryland. From 2008 to 2011, she was a partner at the law firm of Levin & Gallagher LLC in Baltimore, Maryland.

Federal judicial service

United States magistrate judge 
From 2011 to 2019, she served as a United States magistrate judge in the District of Maryland.

District court service

Expired nomination to district court under Obama 

On September 8, 2015, President Barack Obama nominated Gallagher to serve as a United States District Judge of the United States District Court for the District of Maryland, to the seat vacated by Judge William D. Quarles Jr., who retired on February 1, 2016. She received a hearing before the United States Senate Judiciary Committee on April 20, 2016. On May 19, 2016, her nomination was reported out of committee by voice vote. Her nomination expired on January 3, 2017, with the end of the 114th Congress.

Renomination to district court under Trump 

On June 7, 2018, President Donald Trump announced his intent to renominate Gallagher to serve as a United States district judge of the United States District Court for the District of Maryland. On June 11, 2018, her nomination was sent to the Senate. President Trump nominated Gallagher to the same seat. On October 11, 2018, her nomination was reported out of committee by a 20–1 vote.

On January 3, 2019, her nomination was returned to the President under Rule XXXI, Paragraph 6 of the United States Senate. On April 8, 2019, President Trump announced the renomination of Gallagher to the district court. On May 21, 2019, her nomination was sent to the Senate. On June 20, 2019, her nomination was reported out of committee by a 21–1 vote. On September 11, 2019, the Senate confirmed her nomination by a voice vote. She received her judicial commission on September 13, 2019.

See also 
 Barack Obama judicial appointment controversies

References

External links 
 

1972 births
Living people
20th-century American women lawyers
20th-century American lawyers
21st-century American women lawyers
21st-century American lawyers
21st-century American judges
21st-century American women judges
Assistant United States Attorneys
Georgetown University alumni
Harvard Law School alumni
Judges of the United States District Court for the District of Maryland
Lawyers from Washington, D.C.
Maryland lawyers
People from Rockville, Connecticut
United States magistrate judges
United States district court judges appointed by Donald Trump